The 1856 United States presidential election in Alabama was held on November 4, 1856. Alabama voters chose 9 electors to represent the state in the Electoral College, which chose the president and vice president.

Alabama was won by Senator James Buchanan (D–Pennsylvania), running with Representative and future presidential candidate in the 1860 presidential election John C. Breckinridge, with 62.08% of the popular vote, against the 13th president of the United States Millard Fillmore (A–New York), running with the 2nd United States Ambassador to Germany Andrew Jackson Donelson, with 37.92% of the popular vote.

The Republican Party nominee John C. Frémont was not on the ballot.

Results

See also
United States presidential elections in Alabama

References

1856
Alabama
1856 in Alabama
1856 Alabama elections